Marian Turski (born 26 June 1926 as Moshe Turbowicz) is a Polish historian and journalist who served as the editor-in-chief of Sztandar Młodych, a nationwide daily newspaper of the Union of Polish Youth in 1956–1957 and from 1958 onwards, a columnist for the moderately critical weekly Polityka as the head of the weekly's historical department.

Biography 
He was born on 26 June 1926 in Druskieniki, Second Polish Republic (present-day Lithuania). Since 1942 he was in the Łódź Ghetto. His father and brother were murdered after selection. From there, in August 1944, he was deported to German Nazi concentration camp at Auschwitz-Birkenau. He survived forced evacuation of the camp, the Death March of January 1945, from Auschwitz to Wodzisław Śląski, from which he was transported to KL Buchenwald.

After the end of the Second World War, he settled in Warsaw.  From 1945 he became an activist of the youth organization affiliated to the Polish Workers' Party. He later worked in the Press Department of the Polish United Workers' Party. Since 1958, he manages the historical section of weekly Polityka.

In March 1965, while on governmental scholarship to the United States, he took part in Martin Luther King's march against racial segregation in the South of United States: from Selma to Montgomery.

He is a Vice-President of the Jewish Historical Institute Association in Poland, member of the governing board of the Association of Jews, War Veterans and Other Victims of the Second World War II, member of the International Auschwitz Council and Council of the association, which is managing the House of the Wannsee Conference. He is also an Honorary Committee member of the Jewish Motifs Association and the Jewish Motifs International Film Festival, which is organized by this association. Additionally, he also presides the Council of the POLIN Museum of the History of Polish Jews (since 25 March 2009).

On 26 June 2016, on the occasion of his 90th birthday, he received occasional regards from, among others, President of Poland Andrzej Duda, President of Germany Joachim Gauck and Chancellor of Germany Angela Merkel, President of United States Barack Obama, and President of Israel Shimon Peres.

In 2019, on the occasion of the International Holocaust Remembrance Day, he was invited to the United Nations to give a speech during the ceremony on the 28 January 2019, in the General Assembly room.

2020 Auschwitz speech

In 2020, in his speech during the ceremony of the 75th anniversary of the liberation of Auschwitz hosted on 27 January at the memorial site, he called: "Auschwitz did not fall from the sky. It began with small forms of persecution of Jews. It happened, it means it can happen anywhere. That is why human rights and democratic constitutions must be defended. The eleventh commandment is important: Don't be indifferent. Do not be indifferent when you see historical lies, do not be indifferent when any minority is discriminated, do not be indifferent when power violates a social contract."

In July 2020, he wrote an open letter published by Frankfurter Allgemeine Zeitung in which he urged Facebook founder Mark Zuckerberg to remove all Holocaust denying groups, pages and posts as part of the #No Denying It campaign launched by prominent Holocaust survivors.

Family 
He was married to Halina Paszkowska-Turska (died in 2017), a sound operator. Their daughter Joanna Turska is a flautist.

Awards and decorations 

 Silver Cross of Merit (Poland, 1946),
 Commander's Cross with Star of the Order of Polonia Restituta (Poland, 1997),
 Officer's Cross of the Order of Merit of the Federal Republic of Germany (Germany, 2007)
 Officer's Cross of the Legion of Honour (France, 2012), 
 Commander's Cross of the Order of Merit of the Federal Republic of Germany for contribution to the Polish-German relations (Germany, 2013),
 Honorary badge "Merit for the Protection of Human Rights" (Poland, 2015),
 Golden Medal for Merit to Culture "Gloria Artis" (Poland, 2015),
 Honorary citizen of Warsaw (Poland, 2018),
Order of Merit of the Grand Duchy of Luxembourg (Luxembourg, 2020).
 Officer's Cross of the Order for Merits to Lithuania (Lithuania, 2021)

References

External links 
 

1926 births
Auschwitz concentration camp survivors
20th-century Polish historians
Polish male non-fiction writers
Polish Workers' Party politicians
Commanders Crosses of the Order of Merit of the Federal Republic of Germany
Recipients of the Gold Medal for Merit to Culture – Gloria Artis
Łódź Ghetto inmates
Journalists from Warsaw
Polish United Workers' Party members
Living people
Buchenwald concentration camp survivors